Straight Shooter is a 1939 American Western film directed by Sam Newfield.

Cast 
Tim McCoy as "Lightning" Bill Carson
Julie Sheldon as Margaret Martin
Ben Corbett as Magpie Benson
Ted Adams as Brainard
Reed Howes as Henchman Slade
Forrest Taylor as Henchman Luke Green
Budd Buster as Sheriff Ed Long
Carl Mathews as Henchman Lane

External links 

1939 films
1939 Western (genre) films
American black-and-white films
American Western (genre) films
Films directed by Sam Newfield
1930s English-language films
1930s American films